True Tales Of Slaughter and Slaying is a live DVD recording by American extreme metal band Macabre performing on stage in Dordrecht, Holland. It is the band's debut DVD released for their 20th anniversary.

Track listing
 Zodiac
 Jack the Ripper
 Serial Killer
 The Wustenfeld Man Eater
 Dog Guts
 Fritz Haarman der Metzger
 Coming to Chicago
 The Vampire of Düsseldorf
 Acid Bath Vampire
 Ed Gein
 Dr. Holmes
 Fatal Foot Fetish & The Diary of Torture
 Scrub A Dub Dub
 Mary Bell
 The Hitchhiker
 Albert Was Worse Than Any Fish In The Sea
 Dog Guts
 Hitchhiker
 Mary Bell
 Drill Bit Lobotomy

Extra features
Recorded in 5.1 surround sound
Multi-Camera footage
Behind the scenes & out and about with Corporate Death and Dennis The Menace
Tracks 14-17 are bonus tracks.
Tracks 17-20 are songs from Biebob, Vosselaar on the Dahmer Tour.
Limited edition DVD comes complete in a full color metal box.

References

2006 video albums
2006 live albums
Macabre (band) video albums
Live video albums